Tim Loane is a writer, director, lecturer and actor.

Loane created the TV series Teachers for Channel 4 and was the lead writer for the first season.

He was nominated at the 70th Academy Awards for Academy Award for Best Live Action Short Film for the film Dance Lexie Dance.

Loane was educated at Methodist College Belfast and Queen's University Belfast.

References

External links

British male screenwriters
Living people
Year of birth missing (living people)
People educated at Methodist College Belfast